Shiping Zhu is a Canadian engineer, currently a Canada Research Chair Distinguished Professor at McMaster University and is a Fellow of the Royal Society of Canada, Engineering Institute of Canada, Chemical Institute of Canada, Canadian Academy of Engineering, .

References

Year of birth missing (living people)
Living people
Academic staff of McMaster University
Canadian engineers